Denis Klobučar (born 16 April 1983) is a Croatian cross-country skier. He competed at the 2002 Winter Olympics and the 2006 Winter Olympics.

References

External links
 

1983 births
Living people
Croatian male cross-country skiers
Olympic cross-country skiers of Croatia
Cross-country skiers at the 2002 Winter Olympics
Cross-country skiers at the 2006 Winter Olympics
Sportspeople from Rijeka